Maurice Brown (1919–2012) was a British World War II fighter pilot with the Royal Air Force.

Maurice Brown may also refer to:
Maurice "Mobetta" Brown (born 1981), American musician, trumpeter for the Tedeschi Trucks Band
Maurice Russell Brown (1912–2008), Canadian mining journalist

Maurice Browne may refer to:
Maurice Browne (1881–1955), English-American theater producer
Maurice Browne (author) (1892–1979), Irish author and priest who wrote as Joseph Brady
Maurice Browne (cricketer) (1913–1980), New Zealand cricketer